Frank Roy Leaper (9 July 1906 – 6 November 2002) was an Australian rules footballer who played with St Kilda in the Victorian Football League (VFL).

Notes

External links 

1906 births
2002 deaths
Australian rules footballers from Victoria (Australia)
St Kilda Football Club players